Julietta Quiroga Cavalli (born 1 November 1988 in Crossnore, North Carolina, United States) is an alpine skier competing for Argentina. She will compete for Argentina at the 2014 Winter Olympics in the slalom and giant slalom.

She currently resides in Bariloche, Argentina.

References

External links 
 
 
 
 

1988 births
Living people
Argentine female alpine skiers
Olympic alpine skiers of Argentina
Alpine skiers at the 2014 Winter Olympics
Citizens of Argentina through descent
People from Avery County, North Carolina